"Wanderlust" is a song by Canadian singer the Weeknd from his debut studio album Kiss Land (2013). The song heavily samples "Precious Little Diamond" by Dutch disco group Fox the Fox, and was released as the sixth single from the album on March 31, 2014. A remix of "Wanderlust" by Pharrell Williams also appears as a bonus track on the iTunes edition of Kiss Land.

Track listing

Charts

Certifications

Release history

References

2013 songs
2014 singles
The Weeknd songs
Songs written by Belly (rapper)
Songs written by the Weeknd
Songs written by DaHeala
Song recordings produced by the Weeknd
Republic Records singles
XO (record label) singles